Northwood Cemetery was opened in 1915 as a consequence of population growth in the Northwood area. It is now in the London Borough of Hillingdon. The land was once part of Ruislip Common, and covers over 15 acres of land. Access is from Chestnut Avenue.

Notable interments
 Dinah Sheridan, English actress
 Edward George Honey, Australian journalist

References

External links
 

Cemeteries in London